William Tower is the name of:

William Lawrence Tower (1872-?), American zoölogist
William Hogarth Tower (1871–1950), collector

See also

William Towers (disambiguation)